Marlborough Boys' College is a state single-sex secondary school in Blenheim, New Zealand. The school was established as Marlborough High School in 1899 (renamed Marlborough College in 1919). The school its current form in was established in 1963, after Marlborough Girls' College was split off.

History

Overview

The first board of Marlborough High School met on 13 November 1899. Three acres on Stephenson Street (1.2 hectares) were purchased for £600 and another  were donated by Thomas Carter, taking the grounds through to Francis Street. Dr John Innes was appointed the first Head Teacher. The school opened in the Church Of Nativity Sunday School building on Alfred Street, on 26 March 1900, with 18 pupils attending on the first day. The cornerstone for the first school building on the Stephenson Street site was laid on 22 September 1900.

Marlborough High School was co-educational and fee paying with free places to those who could not afford it but who had proved themselves able in the proficiency examination. The change in name from Marlborough High School to Marlborough College was made in 1919.

In 1926 Mr Stewart (Headmaster) was awarded a travelling scholarship to visit junior high schools in Canada and the United States.  The department of education was interested in incorporating a Junior High (Intermediate) into the college structure. In 1927 an intermediate (forms 1 and 2 or years 7 and 8 in current terminology) was established on the site with 275 pupils taking the total roll to 557. The intermediate continued on the site until 1957, when roll pressures required the establishment of Bohally Intermediate on Mclauchlan Street.

In 1963 the Marlborough Girls' College was founded and Marlborough Boys' College continued on the original site. The first official discussion on the division of the college having taken place in June 1947.  Mr Insull, the Headmaster at the time, suggested that “the time would come when the board would have to consider the question of separate boys’ and girls’ schools ... and that the girls school might be established on the other side of town (Mclauchlan Street)". (Marlborough Express, June 10, 1947)

X Static FM89
X Static FM was a radio station in the Marlborough Region of New Zealand which originated as a Marlborough College-based radio station, X-Static FM operated by The X-Static Society. The station was based at the college and broadcast on 89FM with the callsign 2STA. Two years earlier the school ran a temporary radio station as part of a school fundraiser called Artyfacts FM.  This station was the first FM broadcast in the South Island.  X- Static went on air in February 1986 and only operated on a part-time basis during school lunch times and some evenings. The station was rebranded as Marlborough's 89FM in 1988 and remained at Marlborough Boys' College until 1989 when the station moved to new premises at the Blenheim Post Office Building; by this time the station was broadcasting from 6AM to 12AM. In 1990 the X-Static Society in partnership with Fifeshire FM from Nelson launched a new station Sounds 93FM using a commercial frequency purchased at auction from the government.  Sounds FM broadcast in both Picton, Blenheim and Kaikoura.

Marlborough High School building development 1900–1919

1901 – Old School Building opened
1902 – Nosworthy House purchased as Headmaster residence or Rectory (on site of present technology faculty)
1910 – Tower added to old school
1910 – First gymnasium built

The college is located off Stephenson Street, with a large white building housing the English, maths and languages departments on the street front. In 2003–04 a new hall was built to the rear of the complex, and the music department was updated to include new music suites. It has a small swimming pool and is located in the vicinity of St Mary's church.

Proposed relocation
The intention to relocate both Marlborough Boys' College and Marlborough Girls' College on the site currently occupied by MGC and Bohally Intermediate is being planned by a consortium led by construction company Naylor Love. Bohally Intermediate will relocate to the current MBC site on Stephenson Street.

Principals

 John Innes, M.A. LLD. (1900–1922)
 John Stewart, M.A. (1922–1946)
 Herbert A H Insull, M.A., Dip.Soc.Sc. (1946–1964)
 Dugald S McKenzie, B.A., Dip.Ag., Dip.Ed., Assoc.Inst.Ed. (1964–1981)
 Peter J Voss, M.A.(Hons), Dip.Ed. (1982–1991)
 John Rodgers, B.A., Dip.Ed.Studies(Admin), Dip.Tchg. (1992–2009)
 Dave Turnbull, M.A., Dip.Ed., Dip.Ed.Guid, Dip.Tchg. (Interim Principal, Terms 3–4 2009)
 Wayne Hegarty, M.A., Dip.Ed.Mngmt., Dip.Tchg. (2010–2019)
Jeremy Marshall, BSc (Hons), PGCE. (Interim Principal 2020)
John Kendal DipTch, BTch (2021–present)

Notable alumni

Sport

Cricket
Cyril Allcott - New Zealand Test cricketer 1930–1932
Gary Bartlett – New Zealand Test cricketer 1961–1968
Geoff Barnett – Canadian international cricketer
Carl Bulfin – Black Cap
Fen Cresswell – New Zealand cricketer 1949–1950/51
Brendon Diamanti – Black Cap
Ben Wheeler – New Zealand cricketer 2015–present

Cycling

Jason Allen – Professional cyclist, track world cup champion
Graeme Miller – Double Commonwealth Games gold medallist in cycling
Robin Reid – Professional cyclist, Olympian

Football
Michael O'Keeffe – New Zealand football representative

Rugby union

David Hill – All Black
Leon MacDonald – All Black
Quentin MacDonald – Super Rugby player, Crusaders
Atu Moli – All Black
Sam Moli - Tongan Rugby International
Toby Morland – Super Rugby player (multiple franchises)
Ben O'Keeffe – International rugby referee, New Zealand
Anton Oliver – All Black
Kade Poki – Super Rugby player, Highlanders
Alan Sutherland – All Black
Joe Wheeler – Super Rugby player, Highlanders

Other
 Sir Gordon Bell (1887–1970), surgeon
 Eileen Duggan (1894–1972), poet and journalist
 Tom Murray (born 1994), Olympic rower

Notable staff
 Sydney Jones (1894–1982), National MP for Hastings (1949–1954)
 William Sheat (1899–1982), National MP for Taranaki electorates (1926–1928)

References

Boarding schools in New Zealand
Boys' schools in New Zealand
Educational institutions established in 1899
Secondary schools in New Zealand
Schools in Blenheim, New Zealand
1899 establishments in New Zealand
1900s architecture in New Zealand